Ahuitzotl was the eighth Aztec ruler, the Huey Tlatoani of the city of Tenochtitlan, son of princess Atotoztli II. His name literally means "Water Thorny" and was also applied to the otter. It is also theorized that more likely, the animal called ahuitzotl is actually the water opossum, the hand symbolizing its prehensile tail, which otters notably lack. 

Either Ahuitzotl or his predecessor Tizoc was the first tlatoani of Tenochtitlan to assume the title Huey Tlatoani ("supreme tlatoani") to make their superiority over the other cities in the Triple Alliance (Aztec Empire) clear. Ahuitzotl was responsible for much of the expansion of the Mexica domain, and consolidated the empire's power after emulating his predecessor. He took power as Emperor in the year 7 Rabbit (1486), after the death of his predecessor and brother, Tizoc.

He had two sons, the kings Chimalpilli II and Cuauhtémoc, and one daughter.

Biography
Perhaps the greatest known military leader of pre-Columbian Mesoamerica, Ahuizotl began his reign by suppressing a Huastec rebellion, and then swiftly more than doubled the size of lands under Aztec dominance. He conquered the Mixtec, Zapotec, and other peoples from Pacific Coast of Mexico down to the western part of Guatemala. Ahuizotl also supervised a major rebuilding of Tenochtitlan on a grander scale including the expansion of the Great Pyramid or Templo Mayor in the year 8 Reed (1487).

He presided over the introduction of the great-tailed grackle into the Valley of Mexico, the earliest documented case of human-mediated bird introduction in the Western Hemisphere.

Ahuizotl died in the year 10 Rabbit (1502) and was succeeded by his nephew, Moctezuma II.

Ahuizotl took his name from the animal ahuizotl, which the Aztecs considered to be a legendary creature in its own right rather than a mere mythical representation of the king.

In January 2021 the INAH proposed moving the statues of Ahuizotl and Itzcóatl, known as the Indios Verdes, from the Parque del Mestizaje in Gustavo A. Madero, Mexico City to the Paseo de la Reforma. “The transfer means a reading of the urban space, recovering the historical discourse that gave rise to the formation of a set of monuments and roundabouts on Paseo de la Reforma, conceived at the end of the 19th century, with the idea of honoring the Reformation, a great transformation that it meant for Mexico, but to recover a historical reading that began precisely by underlining the Mexican splendor and the importance of the pre-Hispanic or Mesoamerican antecedents of our country ”, Diego Prieto, director of INAH said.

In popular culture
Under the name Teomitl, Ahuitzotl is a primary character in the Obsidian and Blood series by Aliette de Bodard, which are set in the last year of the reign of Axayacatl and the first years of the reign of Tizoc.
In the historical fiction novel, "Aztec" by Gary Jennings, Ahuitzotl is a prominent character. Set in the time just before the arrival of the Spanish Conquistadors, it accounts his construction of the many expansions of Tenochtitlan, and wars of conquest, trade, and proclivities.

References

Bibliography
 Townsend, Richard F. (2000) The Aztecs. revised ed. Thames and Hudson, New York.
 Hassig, Ross (1988) Aztec Warfare: Imperial Expansion and Political Control. University of Oklahoma Press, Norman.
 

Aztec nobility
Tenochca tlatoque
Year of birth unknown
15th-century births
1502 deaths
15th-century monarchs in North America
15th-century indigenous people of the Americas
15th century in the Aztec civilization
1500s in the Aztec civilization
Nobility of the Americas